Lee High School is a four-year public high school that serves students in grades 9–12 from Huntsville, in Madison County, Alabama in the United States, as a part of Huntsville City Schools.

History
Lee High School was named for the Lee Highway (U.S. Route 72) that ran in front of the old school location in the 1950s, which, in turn, was named after Confederate and Union General Robert E. Lee. The school's mascot is now a 5-Star General and, for many years, a painting of General Robert E. Lee mounted on his horse and holding the Confederate flag was on the Gymnasium wall. In 1974 the flag was painted over and the Generals' mascot is now held to represent no specific person.

The original building was constructed in 1957 and opened in the later part of the 1957–1958 school year. The current facility for Lee High School was begun in 2010 and was occupied during the 2012–2013 school year. According to the 1967–1968 Lee High School Student Handbook:

The school operated as a junior high school to allow for the eventual closure of nearby Rison High School and changed its status in tandem with the opening of Chapman Junior High School (later, Chapman Middle School).

In 1986, the Huntsville City Schools created the Lee Arts and Pre-Engineering Magnet programs.  This program draws students from other schools in the city to Lee for study and opportunities in specific areas.  The arts magnet has been rather successful, attracting talented students for theater and vocal music opportunities.

The Huntsville City Schools constructed a new Lee High School facility on Meridian Street, North (next to the original location).

One issue surmounted during construction was the Norfolk Southern railroad adjacent to the school; a raised bridge was erected to allow students to access playing fields that are located across the track from the classrooms.

Although the school's scheduled opening was established as the beginning of the 2012–2013 school year, the new Lee Lyric Theatre had its debut production in June 2012. The production, Oliver!, was a collaboration between the school and Independent Musical Productions.

On August 16, 2012, a ribbon-cutting ceremony marked the opening of the new Lee High School.

The new facility also houses "New Century Technology High School", which was a virtual entity at Columbia High School since the mid-1990s.

Magnet programs
The Huntsville City Schools Performance and Creative Arts Magnet programs are located at Lee High School. Students are admitted to these programs through a combination of interviews, scholastic achievement, and auditions. The magnet programs include Cinematography, Creative Writing, Dance, Orchestra, Photography, Technical Theatre, Theatrical Performance, Visual Arts, and Vocal Performance. In addition to their magnet courses (usually two to three hours per day), students follow a full complement of academic coursework, including AP and pre-AP coursework for most students.

Academics
Lee High School offers a broad array of academic subjects, including a full range of pre-AP and AP courses.

Clubs and organizations
The school sponsors a number of clubs and organization in which students may participate.

Anchor Club
Anime Brigade
Art Club
Beta Club
FCA: Sponsor
Gamma Phi Delta
French Club
German Club
Mu Alpha Theta
National Honor Society
ODD
Peer Helpers
Robotics
Scholars Bowl
SGA: Sponsor
Sigma Phi Psi
Band

Lee High School Band
Lee High's band, The Marching Generals, was awarded First Place in "The Greatest Bands in Dixie", awarded during Mardi Gras in New Orleans in February 1976. As a result, the band was selected to represent the State of Alabama at the inauguration of President Jimmy Carter on January 20, 1977.
Further, the Marching Generals became the first Huntsville City Schools' band to march in the Macy's Thanksgiving Day Parade on 22 November 1984, leading the parade. {Baccus, 1984}
They also got to be in the AAMU Homecoming parades and Magic City Classic multiple years

Sports

 Baseball
 Basketball
 Bowling 
 Cheerleading
 Dancing
 Diving
 Football
 Golf
 Soccer
 Softball
 Swimming
 Tennis
 Track
 Volleyball

Bus accident

On November 20, 2006, a school bus transporting Lee High School students to a local trade school careened over a retaining wall on an elevated part of Interstate 565 at the U.S. highway 231 exit and plummeted 30 feet. Investigating agencies at federal, state and local levels include the NTSB, Alabama State Department of Transportation, Alabama Department of Public Safety, and Huntsville Police Department. Crestwood Medical Center and Huntsville Hospital, the two local hospitals, both activated their Mass Casualty action plans. Emergency response personnel from throughout the area were called upon to assist in rescue efforts.

Notable alumni
J. D. Blair, musician
Buddy Boshers, former Pitcher for the Los Angeles Angels, Minnesota Twins, and Toronto Blue Jays.
Keith Butler, Seattle Seahawks linebacker (1978–1987), Pittsburgh Steelers assistant coach
Ron Cooper, secondary coach of Texas A&M, former head coach at University of Louisville, Alabama A&M
Kim Dickens, actress
Bobby Eaton, professional wrestler
Condredge Holloway, quarterback, Canadian Football Hall of Fame
Craig Kimbrel, pitcher in Major League Baseball currently with Los Angeles Angels, 6-time All-Star, 2011 Rookie of the Year
Ann Levine, law school commentator and consultant
Jim McBride, songwriter, 1995 Alabama Music Hall of Fame Music Creator Award
Amobi Okoye, Defensive Lineman, first-round selection in 2007 NFL Draft
Israel Raybon, football player
Darian Stewart, Defensive Back for Denver Broncos, St. Louis Rams
Chester Rogers, Receiver for Tennessee Titans
Ned Vaughn, actor

References

External links
Lee High School website
Lee's Traveller Web Newspaper for '64-'65-'66 Graduates + Other Welcome Guests

High schools in Huntsville, Alabama
School buildings completed in 1958
Schools in Madison County, Alabama
Public high schools in Alabama
Educational institutions established in 1958
1958 establishments in Alabama